Dodington may refer to:

 Dodington, Gloucestershire, a village and civil parish in Gloucestershire, England
 Dodington, Somerset, a village in Somerset, England
 Dodington, a village in the parish of Whitchurch, Shropshire, England

See also
Doddington (disambiguation)